The women's long jump event at the 2015 African Games was held on 16 September.

Results

References

Long
2015 in women's athletics